Óscar Abraham Lagos Núñez (born 17 June 1973) is a retired Honduran football player.

Club career
Nicknamed el Mexicano because he lived there with his mother in his youth, Lagos played the majority of his career for F.C. Motagua for whom he scored 2 league goals, but also had spells with Real Maya, Real Patepluma and Universidad. He played abroad for Salvadoran outfit Dragón and in 2006 he moved to Nicaragua to play with Real Estelí.

International career
Lagos made his debut for Honduras in a March 1995 friendly match against Brazil and has earned a total of 18 caps, scoring no goals. He has represented his country in 1 FIFA World Cup qualification match and played at the 1996 and 2000 CONCACAF Gold Cups as well as at the 2001 Copa América, where he tested positive for the use of cocaine and marihuana after failing a test after their opening game against Costa Rica. He was subsequently banned from playing for two years.

As a consequence, his final international was the July 2001 Copa América match against Bolivia.

Personal life
Lagos is divorced and has four children. Former World Cup player Juan Cruz Murillo is an uncle, being the brother of his mother.

Lagos has struggled with drugs from the age of 11, visiting three rehab centers without success. As of September 2015, he was without a job and living in poverty.

References

External links

1973 births
Living people
People from Francisco Morazán Department
Association football midfielders
Honduran footballers
Honduras international footballers
1996 CONCACAF Gold Cup players
2000 CONCACAF Gold Cup players
2001 Copa América players
F.C. Motagua players
Real Estelí F.C. players
Honduran expatriate footballers
Expatriate footballers in El Salvador
Expatriate footballers in Nicaragua
Liga Nacional de Fútbol Profesional de Honduras players
Doping cases in association football
Honduran sportspeople in doping cases